Berezovka is a rural locality (a selo) in Nikolayevsky Selsoviet of Zeysky District, Amur Oblast, Russia. The population was 79 as of 2018. There are 4 streets.

Geography 
Berezovka is located on the left bank of the Zeya River, 49 km southwest of Zeya (the district's administrative centre) by road. Algach is the nearest rural locality.

References 

Rural localities in Zeysky District